Aechmea purpureorosea is a plant species in the genus Aechmea. This species is endemic to southeastern Brazil, States of Minas Gerais and Rio de Janeiro.

References

purpureorosea
Flora of Brazil
Plants described in 1834